The 2011 Race of Champions was the 24th running of the event, and took place over 3–4 December 2011 at the Esprit Arena in Düsseldorf, Germany. The Commerzbank-Arena in Frankfurt had been scheduled to hold the event, but after Eintracht Frankfurt's relegation to German football's Second Division, the stadium could no longer host the event on those dates. It was the second consecutive time, and third time overall, that the event has been held in Germany, after the 2010 event was also held in Düsseldorf. Sebastien Ogier overcame Tom Kristensen in the final to become Champion of Champions, whilst Team Germany took their fifth consecutive Nations Cup victory courtesy of Sebastian Vettel and Michael Schumacher. Heinz-Harald Frentzen also won the ROC Legends Trophy after beating Hans-Joachim Stuck, Marc Duez and Stig Blomqvist.

Participants

Cars 
 Audi R8 LMS
 KTM X-Bow
 Euro Racecar
 ROC Car
 Škoda Fabia Super 2000
 Volkswagen Scirocco

ROC Nations Cup

Group stage

Group A

Group B

Knockout stage

Semifinals

Final

Race of Champions

Group stage

Group A

Group B

Group C

Group D

Knockout stage

Quarterfinals

Semifinals

Final

Footnotes

References

External links 
 Official site
 ROC 2011 Results 
 ROC 2011 Replay

Race of Champions
Race of Champions
Race of Champions
2010s in Düsseldorf
International sports competitions hosted by Germany